The Kayaba Ka-1 and Ka-2 were Japanese autogyros, seeing service during World War II for artillery spotting.

Design and development
The Imperial Japanese Army (IJA) developed the Ka-1 autogyro for reconnaissance, artillery-spotting, and anti-submarine uses. The Ka-1 was based on an American design, the Kellett KD-1A, which had been imported to Japan in 1939, but which was damaged beyond repair shortly after arrival. Kayaba Industry was tasked by the IJA to develop a similar machine, and the first prototype was flying on 26 May 1941. The craft was initially developed for use as an observation platform and for artillery spotting duties. The IJA liked the craft's short, take-off run, and its low maintenance requirements. Production began in 1941 and the first autogyros were assigned to artillery units for artillery spotting, crewed by pilot and spotter.

The prototype Ka-Go was a repaired Kellett KD-1A powered by a  Argus As 10c. It went into production as the Ka-1 and about 20 were produced.

Production continued as the Ka-2, powered by Jacobs L-4MA-7 engines, similar to the Kellett KD-1. During production, a shortage of critical components for rotors and engines resulted in severe delivery delays.

A total of 98 Ka-1 and Ka-2 airframes were produced by the end of war. Twelve were destroyed before delivery to the IJA, and about 30 never had engines installed. About 50 were delivered to the IJA, but only 30 were actually deployed. Some sources have stated that 240 were built, but this cannot be verified.

Operational history
The first Ka-1 (the repaired Kellett KD-1A), first took off from Tamagawa Airfield on May 26, 1941. In the following Army trials, performance was deemed excellent. Originally, it was planned to send the Ka-1 to spot for the artillery units based in mainland China, but the change of the course of war in that theater rendered those plans meaningless. Instead, a few Ka-1 were sent to the Philippines to perform the duties of liaison aircraft as replacements for the Kokusai Ki-76. After some time the IJA finally decided on the best use of these unique aircraft, and the majority of Ka-1 and Ka-2 were pressed into service as anti-submarine patrol aircraft. Pilot training for this speciality started in July 1943 with the first batch of 10 pilots graduating in February 1944; followed by another batch of 40 pilots in September 1944.

Originally, the plan was to deploy the Ka-1/Ka-2 from 2D-class cargo ships to spot enemy submarines, but these ships turned out to be too cramped for operations; therefore the Ka-1/Ka-2 unit was assigned to the Army-operated escort carrier Akitsu Maru from August 1944 until her sinking in November 1944. From 17 January 1945 ASW patrols were resumed from an airstrip on Iki Island with a maintenance base located at Gannosu Airfield in Fukuoka prefecture. ASW patrols also started from May 1945 from Izuhara airfield on Tsushima Island. These missions helped to protect one of the last operational Japanese sea lanes between the ports of Fukuoka and Pusan. Eventually U.S. carrier-based aircraft began to appear even in the Tsushima Strait, so in June 1945 the Ka-1/Ka-2 units were relocated to Nanao base on the Noto Peninsula, in the Sea of Japan, operating from there until the end of the war. The Ka-1/Ka-2 did not directly sink any submarines during the war, but they were well regarded for spotting enemy submarines and reporting their positions.

Variants
 Ka-Go: Prototype built around a repaired Kellett autogyro.
 Ka-1: Imperial Japanese Army development of the Ka-Go, powered by a  Argus As 10 engine.
 Ka-2: Imperial Japanese Army development of the Ka-1, powered by a  Jacobs L-4MA-7 engine.

Specifications (Ka-1)

References

External links

 YouTube video of Ka-1 and Ka-2 autogyro tests

1940s Japanese military reconnaissance aircraft
Single-engined tractor autogyros
World War II Japanese aircraft
Kayaba aircraft
Aircraft first flown in 1941